Independent Catholic schools are Catholic primary, secondary schools or colleges that are not operated by a parish or religious order as well as own, fund, and operate themselves. Also included are such schools which seek to teach the Catholic faith but which, lacking approval of the local bishop, are not entitled to call themselves Catholic.

Alaska: Holy Rosary Academy, Anchorage Alaska

Kentucky
Holy Angels Academy, Louisville

Louisiana
Brother Martin High School, New Orleans
St. Louis Catholic High School, Lake Charles, Louisiana

Maryland
 The Avalon School, Bethesda
 Brookewood School, Kensington
 Saint John's Catholic Prep, Buckeystown

Massachusetts
Magnificat Academy, Warren

Minnesota
Providence Academy, Plymouth

Missouri
Barat Academy, Dardenne Prairie
Notre Dame de Sion Grade School for Girls and Boys, Kansas City

New Hampshire
Holy Family Academy, Manchester
Villa Augustina School, Goffstown

New York
School of the Holy Child, Rye

North Carolina

St. Thomas More Academy, Raleigh

South Carolina
St. Joseph's Catholic School, Greenville

Tennessee
Sacred Heart of Jesus High School, Jackson, Tennessee

Texas
St. Gabriel's Catholic School, Austin, Texas

Virginia
 Front Royal

Wisconsin
Providence Academy, La Crosse
St. Ambrose Academy, Madison

See also
List of schools in the United States
List of Baptist schools in the United States
List of international schools in the United States
List of Lutheran schools in the United States

Independent